Van Noy is a surname. Notable people with the surname include:
Jay Van Noy (1928–2010), American baseball player
Junior Van Noy (1924–1943), American soldier
Junior N. Van Noy (ship)
Kyle Van Noy (born 1991), American football player
Zachi Noy
Van Noy Brothers
Henry Clay Van Noy

See also
 Vannoy